The Delta Ice Hawks are a junior "B" ice hockey team based in Delta, British Columbia, Canada. They are members of the Tom Shaw Conference of the Pacific Junior Hockey League (PJHL). The Ice Hawks play their home games at Ladner Leisure Centre.

History

The Ice Hawks joined the league in 1997 as an expansion team. In its PJHL history, the team has won the Cyclone Taylor Cup once, in 2006. The 2006 Championship Ice Hawks team suffered no regulation losses in the PJHL playoffs. The Ice Hawks have won the PJHL Championship in 2001, 2006, 2012 and 2018.

Season-by-season record

Note: GP = Games played, W = Wins, L = Losses, T = Ties, OTL = Overtime Losses, Pts = Points, GF = Goals for, GA = Goals against

Cyclone Taylor Cup
British Columbia Jr. B Provincial Championships

Keystone Cup
Western Canadian Jr. B Championships (Northern Ontario to British Columbia)
Six teams in round robin play. 1st vs 2nd for gold/silver & 3rd vs. 4th for bronze.

NHL alumni

Troy Brouwer
Milan Lucic
Brent Seabrook
Brandon Segal

Awards and trophies
Cyclone Taylor Cup
2005–06

PJHL Championship
2000–01, 2005–06, 2011–12, 2017-18

PJHL Coach Of The Year
 2016–17 — Darren Naylor

PJHL Executive Of The Year
 2017–18 — Eduard Epshtein

PJHL Trainer Of The Year
 2017–18 — Wayne Hubbard

External links
Official website of the Delta Ice Hawks
Official website of the Pacific Junior Hockey League

Pacific Junior Hockey League teams
Ice hockey teams in British Columbia
Ice hockey clubs established in 1997 
1997 establishments in British Columbia
Delta, British Columbia